Freemark Abbey Winery, located between St. Helena and Calistoga in California's Napa Valley, traces its roots to 1886.  Today, Freemark Abbey produces Cabernet Sauvignon, Merlot, Chardonnay, and Sauvignon Blanc, as well as very limited production wines, such as Viognier, Malbec, and Cabernet Franc.  Depending on conditions, the winery sometimes makes a late harvest Riesling known as "Edelwein Gold".

History
The winery was first built by Josephine Marlin Tychson, one of the first women to build and operate a winery in the state.  The winery was originally named Tychson Cellars and it produced Zinfandel, Riesling, and "Burgundy".  Josephine Tychson sold the winery to her foreman Nils Larsen in 1894.   Larson in turn leased the property to Antonio Forni and later sold it to him in 1898.  Forni renamed the winery Lombarda Cellars after his birthplace; Lombarda Italy.  He concentrated his efforts on making Chianti and other Italian style wines which he marketed to the numerous Italians that had moved to Barre, Vermont, the site of America's largest marble and granite quarries. Forni was forced to cease operations when Prohibition began.

In 1939, three businessmen from Southern California, Albert "Abbey" Ahern, Charles Freeman and Markquand Foster purchased Lombarda Cellars. Together they reopened the winery and renamed it Freemark Abbey (a combination which includes a portion of each partner's name).  During the 1940s and 1950s the partners sold the majority of their wines to retail outlets in San Francisco.  The winery went through several hands in the early 1960s before being purchased by a group of seven partners in 1966.  After the purchase, the new owners made major improvements to the facility. This core group owned the winery until 2001 when they sold it to The Legacy Estate Group. In March 2005 the Legacy Estate Group overreached and tried to consolidate Arrowood and Byron into one group. Eight months later, in November 2005, the Legacy Estate group went bankrupt and sold its assets in an auction. Freemark Abbey is now a part of Jackson Family Wines, which is owned by the family of the late Jess Jackson.

Awards
The winery won the New York Wine Tasting of 1973, a wine competition of 23 California, New York, and French Chardonnays. The blind tasting brought together 14 wine experts, including France's Alexis Lichine. Freemark Abbey Winery achieved international recognition when it achieved sixth place in the historic Judgment of Paris, placing ahead of two French and two other California wines.

See also
California wine

References

Further reading
Taber, George M. Judgment of Paris: California vs. France and the Historic 1976 Paris Wine Tasting that Revolutionized Wine. NY: Scribner, 2005.

1886 establishments in California
Wineries in Napa Valley
Companies based in Napa County, California
St. Helena, California